is a retired Japanese volleyball player who played for Toray Arrows. She also played for the All-Japan women's volleyball team and was a captain of the team. She was a participant at the 2004 Summer Olympics,  2008 Summer Olympics, 2012 Summer Olympics and 2016 Summer Olympics, winning a bronze medal in 2012. She was so versatile that she could play any position.

On 10 July 2012, Toray announced that Kimura will move to VakıfBank Türk Telekom next season.

On 3 June 2013, Daikin (which is a sponsor of Galatasaray Daikin) announced that Kimura will move to Galatasaray Daikin next season.

On 5 June 2014 Toray Arrows announced her joining next season.

In 2017, she announced her retirement.

Clubs

Awards

Individuals 
The 12th Women's V.League - New Face Award (2005–06)
2007 14th Senior Asian Championship at Thailand - Best Server
2007-08 All Japan Championship 2008 - MVP
2007-08 Women's V.Premier League - Best 6
2008-09 Women's V.Premier League - Best 6
2009 58th Kurowashi Tournament - MVP
2009 15th Senior Asian Championship at Vietnam - Best Server
2009-10 Women's V.Premier League MVP, Best 6
2010 59th Kurowashiki Tournament MVP, Best6
2010 Piemonte Woman Cup Tournament - Best Server and MVP
2010 FIVB World Grand Prix "Best Scorer"
2010-11 Women's V.Premier League - Excellent player award
2011 60th Kurowashi Tournament - Best6
2011-12 Women's V.Premier League Best 6

Clubs 
 2007 Domestic Sports Festival (Volleyball) -  Champion, with Toray Arrows.
 2007-2008 Empress's Cup -   Champion, with Toray Arrows.
 2007-2008 V.Premier League -  Champion, with Toray Arrows.
 2008 Domestic Sports Festival -  Runner-Up, with Toray Arrows.
 2008-2009 V.Premier League -  Champion, with Toray Arrows.
 2009 Kurowashiki All Japan Volleyball Championship -  Champion, with Toray Arrows.
 2009-2010 V.Premier League -  Champion, with Toray Arrows.
 2010 Kurowashiki All Japan Volleyball Championship -  Champion, with Toray Arrows.
 2010-2011 Empress's Cup -   Runner-Up, with Toray Arrows.
 2010-2011 V.Premier League -  Runner-Up, with Toray Arrows.
 2011-2012 Empress's Cup -   Champion, with Toray Arrows.
 2011-2012 V.Premier League -  Champion, with Toray Arrows.
 2012-13 Turkish Cup -  Champion, with Vakıfbank Spor Kulübü
 2012–13 CEV Champions League -  Champion, with Vakıfbank Spor Kulübü
 2012-13 Turkish Women's Volleyball League -  Champion, with Vakıfbank Spor Kulübü

National team

Senior Team 
2003: 5th place in the World Cup in Japan
2004: 5th place in the Olympic Games of Athens in Greece
2005:  Bronze Medal in the 13th Senior Asian Championship in China
2006: 6th place in the World Championship in Japan
2006:  Silver Medal in Asian Game 2006 in Qatar
2007:  Gold Medal in the 14th Senior Asian Championship in Thailand
2007: 7th place in the World Cup in Japan
2008: 6th place in the World Grand Prix Final round in Japan
2008: 5th place in the Olympic Games of Beijing in China
2009: 6th place in the World Grand Prix Final round in Japan
2009:  Bronze Medal in the 15th Senior Asian Championship in Vietnam
2009: 4th place in the World Grand Champion Cup in Japan
2010:  Gold Medal in Piemonte Woman Cup Tournament in Italy
2010: 5th place in the World Grand Prix Final round in China
2010:  Bronze Medal in the World Championship in Japan
2011:  Gold Medal in the Montreux Volley Masters in Switzerland
2011: 5th place in the World Grand Prix Final round in Macau, China
2011:  Silver Medal in the 16th Senior Asian Championship in Taiwan
2011: 4th place in the World Cup in Japan
2012:  Bronze Medal in the Olympic Games of London in the U.K.
2013: 4th place in the World Grand Prix Final round in Japan
2013:  Silver medal in the Asian Championship in Thailand
2013:  Bronze Medal in the Grand Champions Cup in Japan
2014:  Silver medal in the 2014 Grand Prix in Japan
2014: 7th place in the World Championship in Italy
2015:  Silver medal in the Montreux Volley Masters in Switzerland
2015: 6th place in the World Grand Prix Final round in the United States
2015: 5th place in the World Cup in Japan
2016: 5th place in the Olympic Games of Rio de Janeiro in Brazil

References

External links
 FIVB biography
Toray Arrows Women's Volleyball Team
 FIVB VOLLEYBALL World Cup 2007

1986 births
Living people
People from Western Tokyo
Volleyball players at the 2004 Summer Olympics
Volleyball players at the 2008 Summer Olympics
Olympic volleyball players of Japan
Japanese expatriate sportspeople in Turkey
Volleyball players at the 2012 Summer Olympics
Volleyball players at the 2016 Summer Olympics
Olympic bronze medalists for Japan
Olympic medalists in volleyball
Japanese women's volleyball players
Medalists at the 2012 Summer Olympics
Asian Games medalists in volleyball
Volleyball players at the 2006 Asian Games
Asian Games silver medalists for Japan
Japan women's international volleyball players
Medalists at the 2006 Asian Games
Galatasaray S.K. (women's volleyball) players
20th-century Japanese women
21st-century Japanese women